Vishalakshi Dakshinamurthy is an Indian writer-novelist who writes in Kannada. She is a recipient of Aryabhata Award for her literary contribution to Kannada novel and cinema. She has 64 novels to her credit. Most of her novels were run as soaps for popular magazines like Sudha, Taranga. Her novels are based on family values and traditions of Karnataka. Her notable contributions to literature were through novels like Vyapthi-Prapthi which was adapted into the film Jeevana Chaitra.

Biography

Early life
Vishalakshi Dakshinamurthy was born to Nanjamma Srinivasa Rao and Srinivasa Rao.T.V on 16 November 1938 in Challakere taluk of Chitradurga district, Karnataka. She belongs to Muluknadu Brahmin community, a distinct Telugu language speaking community mainly to have migrated to Karnataka. She grew up in a very large family. She lived in a large traditional Brahmin house with many children, servants, guests and family friends. Her father, Srinivasa Rao.T.V, died when she was 3 years old. Vishalashi's mother, Nanjamma Srinivasa Rao, was the fourth wife of her father. Due to the sudden death of her father, she underwent a lot of childhood trauma and had a very hard childhood. She had three sisters and one brother. Due to financial problems, she discontinued her schooling. Later she was married to B.V. Dakshina Murthy, also popularly known as B.V.D, at the age of 12. Vishalakshi speaks fluently Telugu, Kannada and English. Her husband Dakshinamurthy discovered her love towards novels and encouraged her to write. Hence, she sent one of her stories to Taranga magazine and it quickly became very popular among every reader. Her stories ran in the magazine for a year.

Meanwhile, to her sudden found popularity Vishalakshi received many offers to make her story to be published as a novel. She hence made her first novel. She was a regular contributor to popular Kannada magazines like Sudha, Taranga in the early 1960s and 70s. She was one of the first women novelists in the Kannada language.

Married life
Vishalakshi was married to B.V. Dakshina Murthy at the age of 12. They have three children: Prasanna Shankar, D. Mangala Priyadarshini and Rajagopal. After marriage, Vishalakshi changed her name to Vishalakshi Dakshina Murthy and came to Bangalore leaving her native place Challakere. Vishalakshi currently lives in Jayanagar, Bangalore with her family. She has two granddaughters, Mridula Pandit and Prajwala.

B.V.D died in 2004, due to cardiac failure. Vishalakshi has reasonably reduced her literary work since the sad demise of her beloved husband. B.V.D served as headmaster for National high school and later served as the secretary of National Education Society. He was very popular mathematics and science teacher. He also authored textbooks and few popular books. Mamateya and Nānū vidyāvantaḷāda were his notable novels.

Early influences
Vishalakshi though was born to Telugu speaking family, most of her family contributed towards Kannada literature. She hailed from Taluku Family which was famous for their literary skills. She is also niece of noted Kannada novelist T. R. Subba Rao (TaRaSu). Visits from her uncle and exchange of conversation with him about writing and novels fascinated young Vishalakshi. These early influences blossomed her creativity.

List of few popular novels
 Vyapthi Prapthi
 Kallu Bombe Karagitu
 Vasumati
 Srivanitheyarasane
 Patangagalu
 Olidu Ondadavaru
 Antharangadha Kare
 Hemavathi Manesose

Awards
 Aryabhata Prashasthi,
 B. Saroja Devi Award by Kannada Sahitya Parishat.
 Rajyotsava Award (State Govt Award)
 Jeevana Chaitra - Best story Award (Kannada film)
 Kempe Gowda award

References

1935 births
Living people
Indian women novelists
20th-century Indian novelists
People from Chitradurga district
Novelists from Karnataka
20th-century Indian women writers
Women writers from Karnataka